Marcos Rodríguez Pantoja (born 7 June 1946, in Añora, Spain) is a noted feral child. He was sold to a hermitic goatherder at seven and after the goatherder's death, he lived alone with the wolves in the Sierra Morena. At 19, he was returned to civilization, but had difficulty adjusting. Gabriel Janer Manila went on to write a PhD thesis about his case, which was titled He jugado con lobos (English title I Have Played with Wolves).

He later became the subject of the film Entrelobos (English title Among Wolves), in which he appears briefly.

In March 2018 he gave an interview in which he said he was disappointed in human nature and wished he could return to the mountains and leave society.

Biography 
Marcos was born in Añora, Spain, in the province of Cordoba. He emigrated with his parents to Madrid, where his mother died giving birth to her eighth child, who died shortly thereafter when Marcos was three years old. His father then married another woman who already had a child from a previous marriage. His stepmother subjected him to cruel abuse while she was in charge. In the 1950s they settled in Fuencaliente, Ciudad Real, in the Sierra Morena, where they dedicated themselves to the manufacture of coal.

By 1954, Marcos had spent all of his young life being abused. That year, aged seven, he was sold or delivered to a local landowner who put him under the care of a goat shepherd. The child was to serve as future replacement for shepherd, but was abandoned to nature after his death. In 1965, the Civil Guard found him after eleven years living in complete isolation from human beings and with the sole company of the wolves. The Civil Guard moved him to Fuencaliente by force, bound and gagged, as he howled and bit like a wolf. The police never brought charges against the father, who was still alive at the time, and when he recognized his son, he only reproached him for having lost his jacket.

Nuns employed at a nearby hospital along with a priest taught him, again, the use of speech, how to dress, walk upright, and eat with cutlery. He was admitted to the Hospital de Convalecientes of the Vallejo Foundation in Madrid, until he was reintroduced as an adult to life in society. He was sent to Mallorca where he lived in a hostel paying with his work.

He did military service and dedicated himself to work as a pastor and in the hospitality industry. His wife took advantage of him financially very often through scamming and deception, as he suffered by having limited financial and cultural sense given the many years he spent in complete isolation. After unstable living arrangements in Fuengirola, Málaga, where for a time he even lived in a cave, he moved to a village in the interior of Orense, Rante. There he was welcomed by Manuel Barandela Losada, a retired police officer. Marcos called him the "jefe" and considered him to be family until his death.

Currently, Marcos is sponsored by a Dutch family, being frequently invited by city councils, associations and diverse organizations to give talks and narrate his experience. In addition, he has been interviewed in numerous television programs.

Case study
The study of the case was carried out by the anthropologist and writer Gabriel Janer Manila, who between November 1975 and April 1976, interviewed with Marcos Rodríguez in order to study the educational measures necessary for their integration. The anthropologist stated that the causes of Marcos' abandonment were not fortuitous, but deliberate and the result of a socio-economic context of extreme poverty. The researcher also stressed that Marcos' survival was possible thanks to the basic skills acquired in the previous phase of his abandonment, as well as his extraordinary natural intelligence. During his isolation the child learned the noises of the animals with which he lived and used them to communicate with them, while little by little he abandoned human language.

Once he was again immersed in a social environment, after his rescue by the Civil Guard, he made a slow readaptation to human customs (food, clothing, language, etc.), still manifesting in adulthood preference for life in the field and animals (with which he has a special understanding) and developed some animosity for the noise and smell of cities, considering that life between humans is worse than life with animals. He considers that the hardships he suffered once he was reintroduced into society could have been alleviated in large part if the State had intervened in time.

References

1946 births
Living people
Feral children
People from the Province of Córdoba (Spain)
Humans and wolves